Days to Remember is a 1987 West German-Yugoslav drama film directed by Jeanine Meerapfel. It was entered into the 37th Berlin International Film Festival.

Cast
 Barbara Sukowa as Katharina
 Horst-Günter Marx as Peter
 Bata Živojinović as Onkel Savo
 Rade Šerbedžija as Dušan
 Ljiljana Kontić as Mutter
 Stela Ćetković as Danica
 Igor Hajdarhodžić as Nikola
 Milan Erak as Motorradfahrer
 Veljko Mandić as Alter Ivo
 Dušanka Todić as Tante Gordana
 Silva Povsić as Tante Ljubica
 Svjetlana Knežević as Gasthofswirtin

References

External links

1987 films
Films shot in Montenegro
Films shot in Yugoslavia
West German films
Yugoslav drama films
1980s German-language films
1987 drama films
German drama films
Films directed by Jeanine Meerapfel
1980s German films